A timeline of notable events relating to Heart, a 22-strong network of adult contemporary commercial radio stations operated by Global.

1990s
 1994
6 September – 100.7 Heart FM begins broadcasting, providing a regional service of soft adult contemporary music to the West Midlands, similar to Smooth Radio today.
 1995
5 September – Heart 106.2 launches in London, broadcasting a 'Hot AC' music format.
 1996
 100.7 Heart FM’s music format is modified to Hot AC.

2000s
2005
29 August – Heart 106 replaces Century 106 in the East Midlands.
 2006
Simon Beale starts presenting the weeknight late show.
 2007
25 June – Chrysalis Radio announces the sale of the three Heart stations, along with its sister stations The Arrow, LBC and Galaxy, to Global Radio for £170 million.
 2008
 28 April – The Heart stations begin networking off-peak programmes from Heart 106.2 in London. There are now only ten hours of local programming during weekdays and four hours on Saturday and Sunday.
2009
5 January – Chiltern Radio, Hereward FM, Radio Broadland, Q103, Northants 96, SGR Colchester, SGR Ipswich, and Horizon Radio are all rebranded as Heart after earlier being acquired by Global Radio.
23 March – Fox FM, GWR FM Bath, GWR Bristol, GWR FM Wiltshire, Champion 103, Essex FM, Gemini FM, Severn Sound, Lantern FM, Coast 96.3, Plymouth Sound, Orchard FM, South Hams Radio, Wirral's Buzz and 2-Ten FM are all rebranded as Heart.
May – Orion Media purchases, among other stations, Heart 106 in the East Midlands from Global Radio. A franchise agreement with Global allows Orion to continue to use the Heart identity and carry networked programming from London.
13 June – Spice Girls singer Emma Bunton joins, and begins hosting a pre-recorded show on Heart in the Saturday afternoon slot 4pm – 7pm.
22 June – Invicta FM, Southern FM, 2CR, Ocean FM and 103.4 Marcher Sound are rebranded as Heart.

2010s
2010
21 June – Global Radio announces plans to reduce the number of its local Heart stations from 33 to 15 as part of a reorganisation. The stations will continue to broadcast their own breakfast and drivetime shows – alongside local news bulletins – but all other output will come from London. A further two stations owned by Global will also be subsumed into the Heart network. 
30 June –  Heart Solent replaces Heart Hampshire and Heart Dorset & New Forest.
2 July –  
Heart Cambridgeshire replaces Heart Peterborough and Heart Cambridge.
Heart North Wales and West replaces Heart North Wales Coast, Heart Cheshire and North East Wales and Heart Wirral.
9 July – Heart Thames Valley replaces Heart Oxfordshire and Heart Berkshire.
16 July – 
Heart Four Counties replaces Heart Northants, Heart Milton Keynes, Heart Dunstable and Heart Bedford and Dunstable, later Milton Keynes.
Heart West Country replaces Heart Bristol, Heart Bath and Heart Somerset.
26 July – 
Hertfordshire station Mercury 96.6 becomes part of the Heart network and is relaunched as Heart Hertfordshire. The station operates under a franchise agreement with Mercury's owner Adventure Radio.
Heart Essex replaces Heart Essex (Chelmsford & Southend) , Heart Colchester and Ten 17.
Heart Sussex and Surrey replaces Heart Sussex and Mercury FM. 
27 August – Heart Devon replaces Heart Exeter and Heart Torbay, Heart Plymouth, Heart North Devon and Heart South Devon.
3 September – Heart East Anglia replaces Heart Norwich and Heart Ipswich.
9 November – Orion Media announces that it will launch a brand new station for the East Midlands called Gem 106. Consequently, Heart 106 will end at the end of the year.
2011
1 January – Gem 106 replaces Heart East Midlands at midnight – the first Heart station to cease broadcasting.
Jason Donovan joins to present the Sunday morning show.
2012
7 May –  Heart South West replaces Atlantic FM. A separate Drivetime show for Cornwall continues to air as part of Ofcom speech content requirements.
5 August – Emma Willis and Stephen Mulhern join to co-host the Sunday morning show.
12 October – Heart launches a spin-off television channel called Heart TV on Freesat and Sky.
Roberto joins to present the weekday evening show.
2013
14 March – Jenni Falconer joins to present the Sunday early show. She replaces Jason Donovan who takes a break from the network to tour in the musical Priscilla: Queen of the Desert.
23 June – Simon Beale presents the weeknight late show for the final time. He moves to the overnight show, which until May 2014, features an all-80s music playlist.
Following the closure of all-but one of the regional digital multiplexes, Heart Digital is wound down.
2014
20 January – Global Radio is found to be in breach of their license remit for Heart South West in Cornwall after a listener complained to Ofcom that there was not enough local news and speech to make it a fully local station.
6 May – 
The Real Radio network is rebranded as Heart.
Heart North West and Wales and Heart Cymru relaunch as Capital North West and Wales and Capital Cymru following the relaunch of Real Radio North Wales as Heart North Wales.
2015
Jason Donovan re-joins to present a Sunday evening 80s show.
2016
29 February – Heart Extra begins broadcasting. 
12 November–27 December – Heart Extra is rebranded as ‘’Heart Extra Xmas’’. This is repeated in 2017 and 2018.
2017

16 January – Sian Welby replaces Roberto as host of the weekday evening show.
14 February – Heart replaces its "more music variety" slogan, which it had used since 1996, with "turn up the feel good". The jingle "this is Heart", used for many years beforehand, still remains to this day. Prior to this, the station used this slogan during Heart's Happy Hour (an hour of non-stop feel good club classics), which aired on weekdays at 11am with Toby Anstis and 2pm with Matt Wilkinson.

14 March – Heart 80s begins broadcasting and replaces Heart Extra on free-to-air satellite.
2018
January – Heart removes music from the 1970s & 1980s from its FM output, probably due to new and upcoming music or the popularity of the sister stations Heart 70s & Heart 80s. Heart would now only play music from that era for competitions and events, such as Christmas. Heart's Club Classics began airing for three hours on Friday & Saturday evenings only, rather than one to two hours every evening except Sunday like it did previously. 
13–14 January – Heart makes changes to its weekend schedule. Lilah Parsons takes over the weekend late show, Rochelle Humes joins to present the Saturday afternoon programme and Emma Bunton takes over the Sunday evening show from Jason Donovan.
5 March – Cumbrian station The Bay is relaunched as Heart North Lancashire & Cumbria following Global's purchase of the station from CN Group.
5 July – It is announced that Ellie Taylor and Anna Whitehouse will present a new talk show on Heart on Sunday nights from 10pm–1am.
11 October – After six years on air, Heart TV ceased broadcasting.
2019
26 February – Global announces plans to replace the regional breakfast shows on Capital, Heart and Smooth with a single national breakfast show for each network. Heart's new breakfast show will launch later in the year. The number of regional drivetime shows will also be reduced.
22 March – Annaliese Dayes leaves
8 April – Pandora Christie joins to replace Toby Anstis as presenter of the mid-morning show and host Saturday Club Classics. Anstis moves to Club Classics on Friday evenings.
 20 May – Global confirms around 70 local presenters, mostly freelance, will leave the Heart network with the end of local breakfast and weekend output. Seventeen presenters will host the regional Drivetime shows from June.
 31 May –
 Ten Heart stations cease local broadcasting and merge into four stations in the east, south, west and north west of England. Across the network, all local Heart Breakfast shows aired their final programmes.
 BOB fm ceases broadcasting, after it was sold to Communicorp, and merges with Heart Hertfordshire to form a single countywide station.
 3 June –   Heart Breakfast with Jamie Theakston and Amanda Holden launches, replacing the local Heart Breakfast shows. The number of local and regional Drivetime shows is cut from 23 to ten.
 21 June – Another Heart spin-off station, Heart Dance, launches.
 28 August – Global launches Heart 90s.
 30 August – Global launches Heart 70s.

2020s
2020
 12 March – Heart Extra ceases broadcasting at midnight – it is replaced by a full-time national 'Heart UK' feed.

2021
2 March – Global Radio is given Ofcom approval to drop the Heart Nightly News programme from a number of stations in the network previously owned by GMG Radio. As Real Radio the stations were required to provide extended news content, but Global has successfully argued listeners do not want to hear the programme. Heart also no longer has to commit to 24-hour news. The stations concerned are Heart Scotland, Heart South & West Wales, Heart North Wales, Heart North West, Heart North East, Heart Yorkshire and Heart Cornwall; all were previously operated under the Real Radio name apart from Heart Cornwall.

2022
January – Heart's Club Classics extends its on-air hours, now finishing an hour later, at 11pm.
20 May – Heart 00s launches, broadcasting nationally on Digital One.

References

British history timelines
Heart
Heart (radio network)